John Cother (born c 1492, died c.1532), of Ludlow, Shropshire, was an English politician.

He was the Member (MP) of the Parliament of England for Ludlow in 1523, 1529 and 1536, during the reign of Henry VIII of England

References

15th-century births
16th-century deaths
Politicians from Ludlow
English MPs 1523
English MPs 1529–1536
English MPs 1536